Oshakati East is an electoral constituency in the Oshana Region of Namibia. It comprises the eastern parts of the town of Oshakati. The Okatana River separates Oshakati East from the Oshakati West constituency. The constituency had 22,634 inhabitants in 2004 and 19,606 registered voters .

Politics
In the 2010 regional elections, SWAPO's Lotto Kuushomwa won the constituency with 6,501 votes. He defeated challengers Epafras Nghinamundova of the Rally for Democracy and Progress (RDP, 276 votes), Agatus Antanga of the Democratic Turnhalle Alliance (DTA, 72 votes), Timoteus Kambishi of the Congress of Democrats (CoD, 34 votes) and Ndateelela Nakale of SWANU (16 votes). Councillor Kuushomwa (SWAPO) was reelected in the 2015 regional elections. He won with 5,559 votes, far ahead of Daniel Andreas (DTA) with 241 votes and Natangwe Shiwayu (RDP) with 81 votes.

The SWAPO candidate also won the 2020 regional election, albeit by a much smaller margin. Abner Shikongo obtained 4,575 votes, followed by Simon Neshiko of the Independent Patriots for Change (IPC), an opposition party formed in August 2020, with 2,411 votes.

References

Constituencies of Oshana Region
Oshakati
States and territories established in 1992
1992 establishments in Namibia